The Princess of Pro-Wrestling (POP) Championship is a Japanese women's professional wrestling championship owned by the Pure-J promotion. The title was created in the JDStar promotion on June 24, 2006, when Fuka defeated Natsuki☆Head in the finals of a tournament to become the inaugural champion. On June 17, 2007, JWP Joshi Puroresu's reigning JWP Junior Champion Arisa Nakajima won the title on JDStar's second to last event. Though the two titles were not formally unified, they were defended together from this point onward. The titles remained together in JWP for nearly a decade, before it was announced on February 8, 2017 that the promotion was shutting down. As a result, the two titles were once again be separated, with the JWP title remaining with the promotion's production company, while the POP title moved on to Command Bolshoi's follow-up promotion to JWP, later named Pure-J. Between the transition from JWP to Pure-J, the former JWP roster held events under the name Dream Joshi Puroresu, where the POP title was also defended.

Like most professional wrestling championships, the title is won as a result of a scripted match. There have been twenty-seven reigns shared among twenty-four different wrestlers. Riko Kaiju is the current champion in her first reign.

Reigns 
Fuka was the first champion in the title's history. Arisa Nakajima, Rabbit Miu and Rydeen Hagane share the record for most reigns as champion with two. Manami Katsu's only reign holds the record for the longest reign, at 482 days, while Rydeen Hagane's first reign holds the record for the shortest reign at 21 days. Overall, there have been twenty-four reigns shared among twenty-one different wrestlers. Akari is the current champion in her first reign.

Title history

Combined reigns 

References

External links 
 JWP's official website
 Title history at Wrestling-Titles.com

JWP Joshi Puroresu championships
Women's professional wrestling championships